The UEFA European Under-18 Championship 1988 Final Tournament was held in Czechoslovakia. It also served as the European qualification for the 1989 FIFA World Youth Championship.

Teams

The following teams qualified for the tournament:

  (host, but still qualified)

Quarterfinals

Semifinals

Places 5-8

Places 1-4

Third place match

Final

Qualification to World Youth Championship
The six best performing teams qualified for the 1989 FIFA World Youth Championship.

See also
 1988 UEFA European Under-18 Championship qualifying

External links
Results by RSSSF

1988
International association football competitions hosted by Czechoslovakia
Under-19
1987–88 in Czechoslovak football
July 1988 sports events in Europe
1988 in youth association football